The 1946 Wisconsin Badgers football team was an American football team that represented the University of Wisconsin in the 1946 Big Nine Conference football season. The team compiled a 4–5 record (2–5 against conference opponents) and finished in eighth place in the Big Nine Conference. Harry Stuhldreher was in his 11th year as Wisconsin's head coach. The team averaged 253.1 yards per game of total offense, 179.8 by rushing, and 73.3 by passing.

The team's statistical leaders included Earl Maves with 538 rushing yards, Lisle Blackbourn, Jr., with 175 passing yards, Tom Bennett with 124 receiving yards, and Ben Bendrick with 30 points scored. Center Fred Negus received the team's most valuable player award. T. A. Cox led the Big Nine with an average of 43.0 yards per punt. Clarence Esser was the team captain.

Earl Maves rushed for 155 yards against Marquette on September 21, 1946. In the same game, he set a Wisconsin school record with an 86-yard touchdown run. That record stood until 1957. Also in the Marquette game, Gene Evans set a school record with three interceptions, a record that stood until 1954. The defense held Marquette to five rushing yards in the game.

On September 28, 1946, Wisconsin set a school record by holding California to 71 yards (24 rushing, 47 passing). That record stood until 2005.

The team played its home games at Camp Randall Stadium. During the 1946 season, the average attendance at home games was 45,000.

Schedule

After the season

The 1947 NFL Draft was held on December 16, 1946. The following Badgers were selected.

References

Wisconsin
Wisconsin Badgers football seasons
Wisconsin Badgers football